Juan Carlos Zaragoza Murillo (born January 13, 1984, in Irapuato, Guanajuato) is a Mexican footballer. He last played for Club León in the Liga de Ascenso.

Zaragoza joined Mexican side Atlante F.C. during the Apertura 2005 championship, having previously played in the Primera División de México with Dorados de Sinaloa.

His father El Guallo Zaragoza was also a professional soccer player for Club Irapuato.

References

External links
 

1984 births
Living people
Footballers from Guanajuato
People from Irapuato
Atlante F.C. footballers
Dorados de Sinaloa footballers
Club León footballers
Mexican footballers
Association football defenders